Premjit Sen with the title Hanshi is an Indian martial artist. He twice was gold medalist in world cup (martial arts) and the current ‘A’ Grade referee and judge of Kumite and Kata, respectively in World Karate Federation (WKF). Sen was awarded Times Men of the Year (2022). He serves as Chairman of the Referee Commission of Karate India Organisation (KIO) and the President of Karate Association of Bengal (KAB).

Sen was the referee from India who officiated at the Karate1 Premier League Fujairah (UAE) (March 2022).

Sen is a Judge and Referee of Asian Karate Federation (Recognised by Olympic Council of Asia) and the President of Hapkido federation of India

Recognition 
 Times Men Of the Year Award
 Gold Medal in World Cup of Martial Arts in 2003 and 2008, Australia
 Gold Medal at South Africa open International Sports Kickboxing Championship, 2009
 One Gold, two Silver and one Bronze at ISKA CCP International Championship Australia, 2007
 Two Silver and two Bronze at ISKA World Cup Australia, 2005
 One Gold, one Silver  and 2 Bronze at 13th CCP International Martial Art Championship Australia, 2004 
 Bronze at 10th International Martial Arts Championship, 2001
 Champion of the Europe Open Championship, 2009

References

Living people
Martial artists
Referees and umpires
1973 births